Acotyledon is a genus of mites in the family Acaridae.

Species
 Acotyledon agilis (Canestrini, 1888) 
 Acotyledon bellulus Ashfaq & Sher, 2002
 Acotyledon distantis Ashfaq & Chaudhri
 Acotyledon embio Ashfaq, Sarwar & Parvez, 1999
 Acotyledon falki Ashfaq & Sher, 2002
 Acotyledon haripuriensis Ashfaq, Sher & Chaudhri, 1990
 Acotyledon krameri (Berlese, 1881)
 Acotyledon lamiai Eraky, 1998
 Acotyledon longsetoses Eraky, 1999
 Acotyledon manuri Eraky, 1999
 Acotyledon memphiticus Sevastianov & Gad H. Rady, in Sevastyanov & Ged-Khamada-Khassan-Kh-Rad 1991
 Acotyledon moshtohorensis Sevastianov & Gad H. Rady, in Sevastyanov & Ged-Khamada-Khassan-Kh-Rad 1991
 Acotyledon mykytowyczi Womersley, 1955
 Acotyledon mystax Mahunka, 1978
 Acotyledon neotomae Fain & Whitaker, 1986
 Acotyledon nerminka Eraky, 1999
 Acotyledon pedispinifer (Nesbitt, 1944) 
 Acotyledon privus Ashfaq, Sarwar & Parvez, 1999
 Acotyledon pytho Ashfaq & Chaudhri
 Acotyledon rhizoglyphoides (Zachvatkin, 1937)
 Acotyledon tariqii Ashfaq, Sher & Chaudhri, 1990
 Acotyledon thosmos Ashfaq & Chaudhri
 Acotyledon tshernyshevi Zakhvatkin, 1941

References

Acaridae